Kim Roussakoff (born January 4, 1996) is a Swedish ice hockey defenceman. He is currently playing with Frölunda HC of the Swedish Hockey League (SHL).

Roussakoff made his Swedish Hockey League debut playing with Frölunda HC during the 2014–15 SHL season.

References

External links

1996 births
Living people
Frölunda HC players
Swedish ice hockey defencemen
Ice hockey people from Gothenburg